On 16 August 1986 a Sudan Airways Fokker F-27 Friendship 400M was performing a scheduled domestic passenger flight from Malakal (in present South Sudan) to Khartoum in Sudan, when it was shot down by the SPLA militants. All 60 people on board the aircraft were killed. , the shootdown remains the deadliest incident involving a Fokker F-27 and the deadliest aviation incident in South Sudan.

Background
During the Second Sudanese Civil War, on 5 August 1986, the SPLA militants announced they would shoot down all unauthorized military or civilian aircraft, claiming that the government was using them to transport soldiers and weapons. Approximately at the time of the 1986 shootdown the militants singled out one humanitarian charter company, alleging that the company had a government contract "to spy on and take aerial photographs of" rebel operations. In May 1986 the militants brought down a passenger plane, killing all 13 aboard.

The aircraft involved in the August 1986 shootdown had a serial number 10277. It made its maiden flight in 1965 and accrued a total of 25,702 airframe hours and 19,290 flight cycles.

Shootdown
Shortly after takeoff from Malakal the aircraft was brought down by a Soviet-made Strela 2 surface-to-air missile, fired by a Shilluk contingent of the SPLA. According to contemporary press reports, the missile was captured from the Sudanese army.

References

1986 in Sudan
Accidents and incidents involving the Fokker F27
Airliner shootdown incidents
Mass murder in 1986
Aviation accidents and incidents in 1986
History of South Sudan
Sudan Airways accidents and incidents
20th-century aircraft shootdown incidents
August 1986 events in Africa
1986 murders in Sudan